Jennifer Capriati and Meredith McGrath defeated Andrea Strnadová and Eva Švíglerová in the final, 6–4, 6–2 to win the girls' doubles tennis title at the 1989 Wimbledon Championships.

Seeds

  Carrie Cunningham /  Kim Kessaris (first round)
  Jennifer Capriati /  Meredith McGrath (champions)
  Andrea Strnadová /  Eva Švíglerová (final)
  Kristin Godridge /  Kirrily Sharpe (semifinals)
  Cathy Caverzasio /  Silvia Farina (quarterfinals)
  Michelle Anderson /  Amanda Coetzer (quarterfinals)
  Kerry-Anne Guse /  Nicole Pratt (quarterfinals)
  Sam Smith /  Cristina Tessi (quarterfinals)

Draw

Finals

Top half

Bottom half

References

External links

Girls' Doubles
Wimbledon Championship by year – Girls' doubles